Tieri  is a small mining town and locality in the Central Highlands Region, Queensland, Australia. Established in 1983, the town is a service centre for local coal mines, similar to nearby Middlemount and Dysart,

Geography 
The locality is an "island" within the locality of Lilyvale. The German Creek (towards Middlemount), Oaky Creek Coal No.1 & North and Gregory Crinum mines (Emerald) are situated close by.

History 
Oaky Creek Mine State School opened on 30 January 1979 and closed on 10 September 1982 with replacement Tieri State School opening on 24 January 1983.

Heritage listings

Tieri has a number of heritage-listed sites, including:

 : Tieri War Memorial, Talagai Avenue

Education 

Tieri State School is a government primary (Prep-6) school for boys and girls at 1 Bottlebrush Lane. In 2018, the school had an enrolment of 95 students with 8 teachers and 11 non-teaching staff (8 full-time equivalent). The school motto is "Strive for Success".

There are no secondary schools in Tieri. The nearest government secondary school is Capella State High School in Capella to the west.

Amenities 

According to an early resident, writing in 2010, there were no facilities when people moved to the town.  There were no shops and a bank visited once a week. Tieri now has a whole range of shops for a mining town.  Tieri has bush trails for mountain, quad and dirt bikes. The nearest purpose built motorcross track is in Middlemount approximately 40 km away.

Central Highlands Regional Council operates Tieri Library at the corner of Grasstree and Anncrouye Streets, Tieri.

Notable residents 

 Former Borussia Dortmund goalkeeper Mitchell Langerak hails from Tieri.

See also

References

External links 

 

Towns in Queensland
Mining towns in Queensland
1983 establishments in Australia
Populated places established in 1983
Central Highlands Region
Localities in Queensland